Anthony Raymond Spencer (born 27 April 1965) is an English retired professional footballer who played as a full back in the Football League for Brentford and Aldershot. He spent three years with Brentford and had a loan spell with Aldershot during the 1984–85 season. A knee injury forced his retirement from football in 1985.

Career statistics

References

1965 births
Association football fullbacks
English footballers
English Football League players
Footballers from Chiswick
Brentford F.C. players
Aldershot F.C. players
Living people